The men's decathlon at the 1966 European Athletics Championships was held in Budapest, Hungary, at Népstadion on 30 August and 1 September 1966.

Medalists

Results

Final
30 August/1 September

Participation
According to an unofficial count, 28 athletes from 14 countries participated in the event.

 (1)
 (3)
 (1)
 (1)
 (2)
 (2)
 (2)
 (1)
 (2)
 (2)
 (3)
 (3)
 (2)
 (3)

References

Decathlon
Combined events at the European Athletics Championships